Manuel de Escalante Colombres y Mendoza (1649–1708) was a Roman Catholic prelate who served as Bishop of Michoacán (1704–1708) and Bishop of Durango (1701–1704).

Biography
Manuel de Escalante Colombres y Mendoza was born in Lima, Peru, although some sources say Lerma, in 1649 son of Manuel de Escalante Colombres y Mendoza and Ana María de Laínez de Morales who where married in Lima in 1639.  His brother Pedro de Escalante Mendoza y Laínez was the count of Loja
On 3 October 1701, he was appointed during the papacy of Pope Clement XI as Bishop of Durango.
On October 28, 1618, he was consecrated bishop by García Felipe de Legazpi y Velasco Altamirano y Albornoz, Bishop of Michoacán. On September 17, 1629, he was appointed during the papacy of Pope Clement XI as Bishop of Michoacán; and installed on 27 June 1704. He served as Bishop of Michoacán until his death on 15 May 1708.

References

External links and additional sources
 (for Chronology of Bishops) 
 (for Chronology of Bishops) 
 (for Chronology of Bishops) 
 (for Chronology of Bishops) 

1649 births
1708 deaths
Bishops appointed by Pope Clement XI
18th-century Roman Catholic bishops in Mexico